Sevil is a common female Turkish and Azerbaijani given name. "Sevil" derives from "sev". In Turkish, "sev" means "to love" and "Sevil" means the "be loved".

In contexts in which Spanish terms are anglicized, "Sevil" can be an anglicization of "Seville", the city of Sevilla (as in "Sevil plate", silver money from Sevilla).

People
 Sevil Atasoy, a Turkish forensic scientist and immediate past president of the UN International Narcotics Control Board
 Sevil Hajiyeva, Azerbaijani singer
 Sevil Sabancı (born 1973), a Turkish businesswoman who is a member of the Sabancı family in third generation
 Sevil Shhaideh, Romanian politician 
 Sevil Soyer, a Turkish artist

Works
 Sevil, a 1928 by Azerbaijani playwright Jafar Jabbarly
 Sevil, a 1929 film by Alexander Bek-Nazarov, based on the play
 Sevil, a 1953 opera by Azerbaijani composer Fikret Amirov
 Sevil, a 1970 opera film by Vladimir Gorikker

Fictional characters
Sevil, one of the two protagonists of Merry-Go-Round

Turkish feminine given names